Oran Province is a province (wilayah) in Algeria whose seat is the city of the same name.

Geography
It is located in the northwestern part of the country. Its population is 1,584,607 and it covers a total area of 2,114 km². The province is bordered to the east by Mostaganem, to the southeast by Mascara, to the southwest by Sidi Bel Abbes, and to the west by Aïn Témouchent Province.

History
The province was formed from the former French department of Oran, which was maintained after independence and was transformed into a wilaya (province) by the ordnance of 1968. It inherited its current structure after the re-organization of 1974, when it lost its western and southern parts in favor of the creation of Sidi Bel Abbès Province.

Administrative divisions
As of 1984, the province is divided into 9 districts (daïras), which are further divided into 26 communes or municipalities.

Districts

 Aïn El Turk
 Arzew
 Bethioua
 Bir El Djir
 Boutlélis
 Es Sénia
 Gdyel
 Oran
 Oued Tlélat

Communes

 Arzew
 Aïn Bya
 Aïn El Kerma
 Aïn El Turk
 Ben Freha
 Bethioua
 Bir El Djir
 Boufatis
 Bousfer
 Boutlélis
 El Ançor
 El Braya
 El Kerma
 Es Sénia
 Gdyel
 Hassi Ben Okba
 Hassi Bounif
 Hassi Mefsoukh
 Mers El Hadjadj
 Mers El Kébir
 Misserghin
 Oran
 Oued Tlélat
 Sidi Ben Yebka
 Sidi Chami
 Tafraoui

References

Bibliography

External links 
 Site internet de la Direction de la planification et de l'aménagement du territoire de la wilaya d'Oran 
 Histoire de la wilaya d'Oran
 Paysage d'Algérie - Wilaya d'Oran

 
Provinces of Algeria
States and territories established in 1974